Gardens Commercial High School is a coeducational inner city Secondary School in Cape Town, South Africa with learners aged 12–18 years. In 2006 the school was designated a Business, Commerce and Management (BCM) Focus School. As such, Gardens Commercial is part of an education intervention that aims to redress the Apartheid education system. The school is a lead institution that supports learners with exceptional interest, talent, interest or aptitude in the field of business, commerce and management. Gardens Commercial offers the following focus field subjects: Accounting, Business Studies, Economics and Computer Applications Technology.

History 
Gardens Commercial High School is a fine mixture of the old and the new. The five original houses which still form parts of the school buildings were built in 1882 and were used as University of Cape Town residences during the 1920s. Since then they have housed a private hotel, the offices of the Provincial Administration (1939–1944) and the offices of the Department of Inland Revenue and the Rent Control Board (1944–1967).

In 1967 the demolition of Avenue Terrace - as the buildings were then known – was planned. In its stead a new school would be built to house the pupils from the Day School of Commerce (est. 1961) which, until then, had been a department of the Cape Technical College. These plans, however, were shelved and the original buildings were adapted for use as a school.

In 1968 the school came under the jurisdiction of the Cape Education Department and a year later it was renamed Gardens Commercial High School. The Avenue Terrace buildings survived intact, a second time, when demolition plans were again mooted.

When Louis Karol Architects were commissioned in 1976 to build the new school, their decision to incorporate Avenue Terrace finally guaranteed the survival of these buildings. The intriguing blend of old and new in this design earned the architects an Award of Merit from the Institute of South African Architects.

In 1984 - two years before the school's silver anniversary - the Twistniet Sports Complex was opened in Upper Orange Street. It offered facilities for hockey, tennis, basketball, netball and athletics.

The school is proud of its historic links with the city of Cape Town. In 1993 the old School buildings, the wall and the ground were declared a National Monument. The original deeds of transfer of the ground, are part of the Uitvlugt, date to 1732.

Sport & Culture 

Learners participate in at least one extramural activity throughout the year. The following activities are offered: 
 Argus Quizz
 Athletics	
 Beauty Therapy
 Book Club
 Bowls
 Chess
 Dancing
 Drama
 E-gaming
 Fitness Club
 Interact
 Inter-Faith
 Journaling
 Netball
 Soccer	
 Touch Rugby 
 Website committee

External links 
School Website

References
Gardens Commercial High History

Schools in Cape Town
1968 establishments in South Africa